Unit 5101, more commonly known as Shaldag (Kingfisher), is an elite Israeli Air Force (IAF) Sayeret (special forces) unit and one of the main Special forces of Israel. The unit is part of the 7th Special Air Forces Wing in the IAF. The unit is based in the Palmachim Airbase, and is led by an officer at the rank of lieutenant colonel. 

The unit was inspired by the British Special Air Service (SAS). It specializes in clandestine operation, combat search and rescue, commando style raids, hostage rescue, irregular warfare, long-range penetration, military intelligence operations, special operations, and special reconnaissance within enemy territory.

History
Shaldag was founded in 1974, in the aftermath of the Yom Kippur War, by Muki Betser, a Sayeret Matkal veteran who brought several Matkal veterans with him. Initially operating as a Sayeret Matkal reserve company, it was eventually transferred to the IAF.

Shaldag's mission is to deploy undetected into combat and hostile environments to conduct special reconnaissance, establish assault zones or airfields, while simultaneously conducting air traffic control and commando actions. Shaldag operates from Palmachim Airbase. Its soldiers carry  M16 or M4A1 assault rifles fitted with the M203 grenade launcher. For special missions, they carry Glock 17 and 19 9×19mm series pistols and Mauser SR 82/66 sniper rifles.

Recruitment and training
In order to be considered for service in the unit, candidates must have a medical profile between 82-97. Candidates who pass the initial commando units day selection, undergo a 5-day commando selection trial for Sayeret Matkal / Shaldag / Unit 669. Candidates who are accepted are enlisted in the November draft. Medics in the unit are drafted in August. 

Shaldag Unit operators undergo the longest training phase of any unit in the IDF, lasting 22 months, and training has a heavy emphasis on navigation. Training consists of phases, with navigation exercises between each phase, designed to provide extensive navigation experience while elevating intense physical tension from long forced marches with heavy weights. The phases are:

 Six months of basic and advanced infantry training.
 Parachuting course at the IDF's parachuting school.
 Counter-terrorism course at the IDF's counter-terrorism school.
 All-weather and all-terrain navigation exercises.
 Air-to-ground cooperation and airborne operations.
 Intelligence gathering, communication and reconnaissance training.
 Specialized training for those with designated roles such as medics and snipers.
 Two-week course in enduring enemy captivity, including being subjected to a surprise mock kidnapping, held in prison-like conditions, and subjected to threats, interrogation, physical violence and humiliation. 

At the end of their training, Shaldag operators receive a book about David Stirling and the SAS's campaign in North Africa.

Unit members who finish their training are required to sign on for 24 months of career services, in addition to their mandatory service of 2 years and 8 months.

Unit pin and emblem 
The unit's warrior pin and the unit's insignia were created in 1987 while Avihu Ben-Nun was the IAF commander. The warrior pin includes a kingfisher, wings, and a star of David. The unit's name apparently originates from a quote by David Stirling, founder of the British SAS, who said his unit will come down on an enemy like a kingfisher comes down on its prey.

Known operations
Shaldag carried out several missions during Operation Litani of 1978. One of its last missions was reconnaissance near Hasbaya. The unit crossed into enemy territory, came under fire, and a team commander lost his leg to a landmine. The company commander managed to retreat without further casualties or the loss of equipment. It took part in the 1982 Lebanon War, and assisted in Operation Mole Cricket 19.

In 1984 Shaldag took part in Operation Moses in Sudan. In 1991 it took part in Operation Solomon: On May 24–25, under the command of Benny Gantz, Shaldag unit secured the airlift of 14,000 Ethiopian Jews from Addis Ababa to Israel. During the First Intifada, its operatives were the first to mount undercover operations in civilian disguises in the Palestinian territories, prior to the formation of the Samson Unit and Duvdevan Unit.

During the 1982–2000 South Lebanon conflict, Shaldag took part in operations Accountability and Grapes of Wrath. It proved particularly valuable during the latter, when it helped quickly pinpoint Hezbollah rocket squads in time for the Israeli Air Force to take them out. It received the Chief of Staff Citation for its conduct in that operation. It also participated in the Second Intifada, and is known to have been responsible for the assassination of Yussef Abu Sway, a Palestinian militant who had taken part in shooting attacks against Israelis. During the 2006 Lebanon War, Shaldag took part in Operation Sharp and Smooth, the August 1 raid on Baalbek. Delivered by helicopters near Baalbek at 01:00, its troops proceeded north to the Sheik Habib neighborhood in order to arrest suspected Hezbollah operatives. En route, they encountered four Hezbollah fighters and killed them. A total of 19 Hezbollah fighters were killed, with no Israeli fatalities.

In 2007 Shaldag was also reportedly involved in Operation Orchard, the destruction of a Syrian nuclear reactor. The unit is reported to have infiltrated an underground depot near the Syrian site suspected of being a nuclear reactor, in order to designate the target for the incoming Israeli fighters that destroyed it. 

During the 2014 Gaza War, Shaldag operatives assisted in uncovering Hamas tunnels, and provided support for IDF units operating during fighting in Gaza. Notably, a Shaldag sniper team supported Nahal Brigade infantry forces in the northern Gaza Strip.

Notable members
Muki Betser
Benny Gantz
Doron Almog
Tal Russo

See also
United States Air Force Combat Control Team
Israeli special forces units

References

Air force special forces units
Special forces of Israel
Israeli Air Force units
Military units and formations established in 1974
1974 establishments in Israel